WOKZ 105.9 FM is a radio station broadcasting a country music format. Licensed to Fairfield, Illinois, the station is owned by The Original Company, Inc.

History
The station began broadcasting in September 1996, airing a country music format. The station was originally owned by David Land's Wayne County Broadcasting Co. In 2012, Land sold WOKZ, along with WFIW and WFIW-FM, to The Original Company for $962,766.67.

The call letters WOKZ-FM were previously assigned to a station in Alton, Illinois; it began broadcasting in 1948 on 99.9 MHz.

References

External links
WOKZ's official website

Country radio stations in the United States
OKZ
Radio stations established in 1996
1996 establishments in Illinois